The abiF RNA motif is a conserved RNA structure that was discovered by bioinformatics.

References